West Vienna, also known as Boles, is an unincorporated community in Johnson County, Illinois, United States. West Vienna is located at the junction of Illinois Route 37 and Illinois Route 146, west of Vienna. West Vienna has a post office with ZIP code 62909, though the post office uses the name Boles.

References

Unincorporated communities in Johnson County, Illinois
Unincorporated communities in Illinois